Gerard Granollers Pujol (born 30 January 1989 in Barcelona) is an inactive professional tennis player from Spain. He has won 12 ATP Challenger tournament titles, all of them in doubles.
His brother Marcel is also a tennis player, and they have won five Challenger doubles titles together.

Grand Slam performance timelines

Singles

Doubles

ATP Challenger and ITF Futures finals

Singles: 37 (16–21)

Doubles: 91 (61–30)

Notes

References

External links
 
 

Tennis players from Catalonia
Spanish male tennis players
Tennis players from Barcelona
1989 births
Living people
Mediterranean Games bronze medalists for Spain
Competitors at the 2009 Mediterranean Games
Mediterranean Games medalists in tennis